Hyggen is a small village in Røyken in Asker municipality, Viken county, Norway.

Overview
Hyggen is a coastal village located along the east side of Drammensfjord. Hyggen is 4 km from Røyken, 13.7 km from Drammen and 40.6 km from Oslo. The village had 739 residents as of 1 January 2014. Hyggen was previously best known for its granite quarry.  Today it is most associated with the cultivation of fruits and berries. Hyggen has both a marina and a beach. It offers short distances to recreational areas, as well as the hiking trails.

Etymology
The name Hyggen probably comes from the Old Norse Heggvin (Norwegian: Hegg) a reference to the bird cherry,  a tree native to northern Europe. In his book Røyken Bygd – før og nu (1928), Oluf Rygh offers an alternative, suggesting it was named after a small stream called Heggja or rather Hegg. 
 The oldest written reference to Hyggen is from Aslak Bolts jordebok (1432–1433) a register of properties and incomes of the Archdiocese of Nidaros. The name has evolved over time; in 1400  Heggenni, Heggiunne and Hæggenne, Hegginna, in 1512 Hegien gorden, in 1617 Heggind and in 1723 Hyggen.

Gallery

References

External links
Hiking Trails near Hyggen

Villages in Viken (county)
Villages in Buskerud
Villages in Asker
Villages in Røyken
Røyken